Lyytinen is a Finnish surname.

Geographical distribution
As of 2014, 91.7% of all known bearers of the surname Lyytinen were residents of Finland (frequency 1:4,547), 5.3% of the United States (1:5,160,733) and 1.1% of Canada (1:2,453,200).

In Finland, the frequency of the surname was higher than national average (1:4,547) in the following regions:
 1. Northern Savonia (1:801)
 2. Central Finland (1:2,911)
 3. Southern Savonia (1:3,110)
 4. Päijänne Tavastia (1:3,822)

People
 Edla Lyytinen (1874–1919), Finnish politician
 Kalle Lyytinen (born 1953), Finnish computer scientist
 Erja Lyytinen (born 1976), Finnish vocalist, guitarist and songwriter
 Joonas Lyytinen (born 1995), Finnish professional ice hockey defenceman

References

Finnish-language surnames
Surnames of Finnish origin